Williamson Murray (born November 23, 1941) is an American historian and author. He has authored numerous works on history and strategic studies, and served as an editor on other projects extensively. As of 2012, he is professor emeritus of history at Ohio State University.

Education and service
Murray completed his secondary education in 1959 at Berkshire School in Sheffield, Massachusetts. He attended Yale University, graduating in 1963 with honors in history. Following graduation he served as an officer in the United States Air Force for 5 years. He was assigned a tour of duty in Southeast Asia with the 314th Tactical Airlift Wing operating C-130s. Following his military service he returned to Yale as a graduate student in the Department of History, and in 1974 earned his Ph.D. in military-diplomatic history.

Career
Following his graduation from Yale, Murray taught in the school's history department for two years. In 1977 he took a job at Ohio State University as a military and diplomatic historian. He was awarded the Alumni Distinguished Teaching Award in 1987. He retired from Ohio State in 1995 as a professor emeritus of history. He has taught at a number of universities, military academies and war colleges, including the United States Air War College, the United States Military Academy, and the Naval War College. He has served as a Secretary of the Navy Fellow at the Navy War College, the Centennial Visiting Professor at the London School of Economics, the Matthew C. Horner Professor of Military Theory at the Marine Corps University, the Charles Lindbergh Chair at the Smithsonian’s Air and Space Museum, and the Harold K. Johnson Professor of Military History at the Army War College".

He has authored numerous works on history and strategic studies, and served as an editor on other projects extensively.

As of 2012, he is professor emeritus of history at Ohio State University.

Works 
2017: America and the Future of War: The Past as Prologue
2016: A Savage War: A Military History of the Civil War (co-author with Wayne Wei-siang Hsieh.)
2014: The Iran-Iraq War (co-author with Kevin Woods)
2014: Successful Strategies, Triumphing in War and Peace from Antiquity to the Present (co-edited with Richard Sinnreich)
2012: Hybrid Warfare: Fighting Complex Opponents from the Ancient World to the Present (co-edited with Peter Mansoor)
2011: The Shaping of Grand Strategy: Policy, Diplomacy, and War (co-editor with Richard Hart Sinnreich and James Lacey)
2011: War, Strategy, and Military Effectiveness2011: Military Adaptation in War: With Fear of Change 
2009: Conflicting Currents: Japan and the United States 
2009: The Making of Peace: Rulers, States, and the Aftermath of War (co-editor with James Lacey)
2007: Calculations, Net Assessment and the Coming of World War II (co-author with Allan R. Millett)
2006: The Past as Prologue: The Importance of History to the Military Profession (co-editor with Richard Sinnreich)
2003: The Cambridge History of War (contributing editor)
2003: The Iraq War: A Military History (co-author with Major General Robert Scales, Jr.)
2001: A War To Be Won: Fighting the Second World War (co-author with Allan R. Millett)
2001: The Dynamics of Military Revolution: 1300-2050 (co-editor with MacGregor Knox)
1999: War in the Air: 1914-19451996: Military Innovation in the Interwar Period (co-editor with Allan R. Millett)
1995: The Air War in the Persian Gulf1994: The Making of Strategy: Rulers, States, and War (co-editor with MacGregor Knox and Alvin Bernstein)
1992: Calculations, Net Assessment and the Coming of World War II (co-editor with A Allan R. Millett)
1992: German Military Effectiveness1991: Military Effectiveness: Three volumes: The First World War, The Interwar Period, and the Second World War (co-editor with Allan R. Millett)
1985: Luftwaffe1984: The Change in the European Balance of Power, 1938-1939: The Path to Ruin''

References

External links 
 
 Prof. Williamson Murray on Grand Strategy

Living people
Yale University alumni
United States Military Academy faculty
Ohio State University faculty
20th-century American historians
21st-century American historians
20th-century American male writers
21st-century American male writers
American male non-fiction writers
Military historians
1941 births